Sunriver may refer to:
 Sunriver (2003–2009), an American Thoroughbred racehorse
 Sunriver, Oregon, a private resort community in Oregon
 Sunriver Observatory, an observatory located in Sunriver, Oregon
 Sunriver Resort, a luxury resort in Oregon

See also
 Sun River, a tributary of the Missouri River in the Montana